Davenport is a provincial riding in Toronto, Ontario, Canada. It elects one member to the Legislative Assembly of Ontario.

It was created in 1999 from parts of Oakwood, Dovercourt, Parkdale, High Park—Swansea and a small part of York South.

When the riding was created, it included all of Metro Toronto within the following line: Dovercourt Road to the CN railway to the Old Toronto city limits to Old Weston Road to Rogers Road to another CN railway to Eglinton Avenue to Dufferin Street to Rogers Road to Oakwood Avenue to Holland Park Avenue to Winona Drive to Davenport Road to Ossington Avenue to the CP railway back to Dovercourt Road.

In 2007, the boundaries were extended in the east so that they continued along Ossington south of the CP railway until Dundas Street and in the northwest the boundary became Keele Street and Lavender Road instead of the old city limits.

Members of Provincial Parliament

Election results

	

	

	

|align="left" colspan=2|Liberal hold
|align="right"|Swing
|align="right"|  -10.41
|

^ Change is from redistributed results

2007 electoral reform referendum

 This riding was one of five ridings where a majority of voters supported MMP.

References

External links
Elections Ontario Past Election Results
Map of riding for 2018 election

Ontario provincial electoral districts
Provincial electoral districts of Toronto